Anny Lorena Cortés Ortíz) (born January 4, 1990 in Cali, Valle del Cauca) is a judoka from Colombia.

Early and personal life
Anny is a member of Liga Vallecaucana de Judo club and she is very good friend with world champion and Olympian Yuri Alvear.

In autumn 2009 she underwent surgery of knee so she could not start at Brazil Judo Grand Prix.

Judo career
She is a member of the Colombian national judo squad in the half-heavyweight category and is a medal winner from the continental games and championships. Her sparring partner is Yuri Alvear.

Cortés won the bronze medal for the team competition in the 2006 Central American and Caribbean Games. She also won the gold medal for the under 78 kg and the bronze in team competition at the 2010 Central American and Caribbean Games.

Achievements

References

External links
 

1990 births
Living people
Colombian female judoka
Central American and Caribbean Games gold medalists for Colombia
Central American and Caribbean Games bronze medalists for Colombia
Competitors at the 2006 Central American and Caribbean Games
Competitors at the 2010 Central American and Caribbean Games
South American Games gold medalists for Colombia
South American Games silver medalists for Colombia
South American Games medalists in judo
Competitors at the 2010 South American Games
Central American and Caribbean Games medalists in judo
Sportspeople from Cali
21st-century Colombian women